Michael Albert Phair (born August 1950) is a Canadian politician, who served on Edmonton City Council from 1992 until 2007. He was the first openly gay elected politician in the province of Alberta, as well as one of the earliest openly gay elected officials anywhere in Canada.

In 1981, Phair was one of 56 men arrested by the Edmonton Police Service during a raid by the morality control unit on the Pisces Health Spa, a gay bathhouse. He was convicted, but then appealed and had his record scrubbed.

Following his retirement from elected politics, Phair has continued to be active in the community, including as a board member of Edmonton Pride.

Mr. Phair is an adjunct professor with the Institute for Sexual Minority Studies and Services (iSMSS) in the Faculty of Education at the University of Alberta.

In June 2015, the Edmonton Public School Board honoured Phair by naming a school after him citing his work with HIV Edmonton and Edmonton Homeward Trust. The school will serve students in Grades 7 through 9 with a capacity of approximately 900 students. The school opened in 2017 in the Webber Greens neighbourhood.

On February 25, 2016, Phair was named Chairman of the University of Alberta Board of Governors. On August 16, 2019, Phair was replaced with the appointment of Kate Chisholm by the UCP government.

In recognition of his community contributions, Phair received an honorary doctor of laws degree from the University of Alberta on June 8, 2022.

References

External links
Michael Phair profile Edmonton City Council
Michael Phair

1950 births
Living people
Edmonton city councillors
LGBT municipal councillors in Canada
Gay politicians
People from Loyal, Wisconsin
Towson University alumni
Canadian gay men
20th-century Canadian politicians
20th-century Canadian LGBT people
21st-century Canadian politicians
21st-century Canadian LGBT people